Make the Road by Walking is the debut album by Brooklyn based group Menahan Street Band. It was released on October 14, 2008 through Dunham Records, a then-new subsidiary of Daptone Records. The album is named after a Brooklyn non-profit organization which is located around the corner from Menahan Street (on Grove Street), which promotes social and economic justice through advocacy and legal work.

Hip-hop samples 
The title song, "Make the Road by Walking",  was sampled by Jay-Z on the track "Roc Boys (And the Winner Is)..." on his album American Gangster, which was named by Rolling Stone to be the No. 1 single of 2007.

The song "The Traitor" has been sampled on songs including "Solo Dolo" by Kid Cudi and "Talking in Codes" by 50 Cent.

"Tired of Fighting" has been sampled on songs including "Faith" by Kendrick Lamar, "Flying Iron" by Curren$y and "Not Long" by Ludacris.

Track listing

References 

2008 albums
Daptone Records albums